Joaquín and Lucía Galán, better known as Pimpinela (Spanish for pimpernel) are an Argentine duo famous for singing romantic musical pieces and known for their original singing style. They have sold over 12 million records in Argentina and a total of 18 million worldwide, making them one of the best-selling Latin music artists.

History
Lucía Galán Cuervo and Joaquín Roberto Galán Cuervo were born in Buenos Aires, Argentina. Joaquín and Lucía are siblings of Spanish settler ancestry, more accurately of an Asturian father and Leonese mother. At first, they sang for family and friends, but later they each pursued a solo career. Joaquín joined the group "Luna de Cristal".

In 1981 the duo recorded their first single together.

In 1984 their song "Olvídame y pega la vuelta" became a number one hit. Others followed, and as they continued to rise in fame, they developed a characteristic style of couples arguing and breaking up, rather than falling in love.

In December 2020, Pimpinela released the single "2020: El Año Que Se Detuvo el Tiempo", whose lyrics reflect on the emotional impact of the COVID-19 Pandemic that had been going for a full year at the time of release.

Discography 
 1981 – Las primeras golondrinas
 1982 – Pimpinela
 1983 – Hermanos
 1984 – Convivencia
 1985 – Lucía y Joaquín
 1986 – El duende azul
 1987 – Valiente
 1987 – 12 grandes éxitos con CBS
 1988 – Ahora me toca a mí
 1990 – Hay amores y amores
 1991 – 10 años después
 1992 – Pimpinela 92
 1993 – Hay amores que matan
 1994 – Nuestras 12 canciones en vivo
 1995 – De corazón a corazón
 1997 – Pasiones
 1998 – Marido y mujer
 1999 – Corazón gitano
 2000 – Buena onda
 2001 – Gold
 2003 – Al modo nuestro
 2005 – ¿Dónde están los hombres?
 2008 – Diamante
 2011 – Estamos todos locos
 2016 - Son Todos Iguales
 2020 - El año que se detuvo el tiempo

References

External links
 Official Website

Argentine pop music groups
Argentine people of Spanish descent
Argentine people of Asturian descent
Sibling musical duos
Latin Grammy Lifetime Achievement Award winners
Pop music duos
Male–female musical duos